The Battle of Bab El Bekkouche during the Algerian War took place on 28 May 1958 in the region of Ouarsenis.

The French army had mobilized nearly 8,000 soldiers. Faced with this situation, the "katiba El karimia" of the Wilaya IV, commanded by Si Ameur Mesbah, had developed a plan to loosen the vise by targeting several military post colonies in Bordj Bounaama, Sidi Abed, Lardjem and Tamalaht, to disperse the French troops.

The French colonial army suffered heavy losses in this battle (600 deaths, including 33 officers and two aircraft destroyed). In the ranks of the National Liberation Army (NLA), 360 were killed. 240 civilians were also killed.

See also 

 French Algeria

References 

Conflicts in 1958
Bab El Bekkouche 1958
Urban warfare
1958 in France
1958 in Algeria